St. Charles County is in the central eastern part of the U.S. state of Missouri. As of the 2020 census, the population was 405,262, making it Missouri's third-most populous county. Its county seat is St. Charles. The county was organized October 1, 1812, and named for Saint Charles Borromeo, an Italian cardinal. 

St. Charles County is part of the St. Louis, MO-IL Metropolitan Statistical Area and contains many of the city's northwestern suburbs. The wealthiest county in Missouri, St. Charles County is one of the nation's fastest-growing counties.

St. Charles County includes a part of the Augusta AVA, an area of vineyards and wineries designated by the federal government in 1980 as the first American Viticultural Area. The county's rural outer edge along the south-facing bluffs above the Missouri River, is also part of the broader Missouri Rhineland.

History
The County of St. Charles was originally called the District of St. Charles and had no definite limits until 1816 to 1818 when neighboring counties were formed. The borders of St. Charles are the same today as they were in 1818.

Geography

Adjacent counties
Lincoln County (northwest)
Calhoun County, Illinois (north)
Jersey County, Illinois (northeast)
Madison County, Illinois (east)
St. Louis County (southeast)
Franklin County (south)
Warren County (west)

Major highways
 I-64 – Major freeway in the western portion of the county. Originally U.S. Route 40, the highway was upgraded to Interstate standards in the late 2000s. The highway was re-signed as Interstate 64 from the Daniel Boone Bridge to Interstate 70 in Wentzville in 2009.
 I-70 – The major east–west thoroughfare in the county. It is mostly a six-lane freeway in the county, but there are sections in St. Charles and St. Peters where the Interstate widens to 11 lanes of traffic.
 Interstate 70 Business
 US-40
 US-61
 US-67
 Rte-79
 Rte-94
 Rte-364 – A freeway in the southern and central portions of the county that begins at Interstate 270 in western St. Louis County and ends at Interstate 64 in Lake St. Louis.
 Rte-370 – A six-lane freeway that connects Interstate 70 in St. Charles County and Interstate 270 in St. Louis County.

National protected area
Two Rivers National Wildlife Refuge (part)

Climate

Demographics

As of 2020, there were 405,262 people and 150,668 households residing in the county. There were 161,144 housing units. The racial makeup of the county was 83.8% White, 5.2% African American, 0.1% Native American, 2.8% Asian, 0.1% Pacific Islander, and 6.5% from two or more races. Hispanic or Latino made up 4.0% of the population.

There were 101,663 households, out of which 40.50% had children under the age of 18 living with them, 63.20% were married couples living together, 9.20% have a woman whose husband does not live with her, and 24.20% were non-families. 19.40% of all households were made up of individuals, and 5.90% had someone living alone who was 65 years of age or older. The average household size was 2.76 and the average family size was 3.18.

In the county, the population was spread out in age, with 29.00% under the age of 18, 8.20% from 18 to 24, 32.60% from 25 to 44, 21.60% from 45 to 64, and 8.80% who were 65 years of age or older. The median age was 34 years. For every 100 females there were 97.10 males. For every 100 females age 18 and over, there were 94.10 males.

The median income for a household in the county was $71,458, and the median income for a family was $64,415. Males had a median income of $44,528 versus $29,405 for females. The per capita income for the county was $23,592. 4.00% of the population and 2.80% of families were below the poverty line. Out of the total people living in poverty, 4.90% are under the age of 18 and 5.10% are 65 or older.

St. Charles County has had one of the fastest-growing populations in the state for many decades, with 55% growth in the 1970s, 48% in the 1980s, 33% in the 1990s, and another 27% in the 2000s. The county sits at a cross-section of industry, as well as extensive retail and some agriculture. With the Missouri River on the south and east and the Mississippi River on the north, the county is bisected east to west by Interstate 70. After St. Charles Airport closed in 2010, the county has one remaining small airport, St. Charles County Smartt Airport. Two ferries cross the Mississippi River from St. Charles County.

2020 Census

Education

Public schools
School districts include:
 Fort Zumwalt R-II School District
 Francis Howell R-III School District
 Orchard Farm R-V School District
 St. Charles R-VI School District
 Washington School District
 Wentzville R-IV School District

High schools (all grades 9–12):
 Fort Zumwalt District
 Fort Zumwalt East High School – St. Peters
 Fort Zumwalt North High School – O'Fallon
 Fort Zumwalt South High School – St. Peters
 Fort Zumwalt West High School – O'Fallon
 Francis Howell District
 Francis Howell Central High School – Cottleville
Francis Howell North High School – St. Peters
Francis Howell High School – Weldon Spring Heights
 Orchard Farm District
 Orchard Farm High School – St. Charles
 St. Charles District
St. Charles High School – St. Charles
 St. Charles West High School – St. Charles
 Wentzville District
 Liberty High School – Lake St. Louis
 Emil E. Holt High School – Wentzville
 Timberland High School – Wentzville

Private schools

Alternative schools
Boonslick State School – St. Peters – Special Education
 Fort Zumwalt Hope High School – O'Fallon – Other/Alternative School – (09-12)
Francis Howell Union High School – St. Charles – Other/Alternative School – (09-12)
Heritage Landing – St. Peters – Other/Alternative School – (06-12)
The Lead School – O'Fallon – Other/Alternative School – (K-12)
Lewis & Clark Career Center – St. Charles – Vocational/Technical School – (09-12)
Quest Day Treatment Center – St. Charles – Other/Alternative School – (06-12)
Success Campus – St. Charles – Other/Alternative School – (09-12)

Higher education
Lindenwood University – St. Charles
St. Charles Community College – Cottleville

Public libraries
St. Charles City-County Library District

Government
St. Charles County is governed by a county executive and a county council. The county council consists of seven members, each elected from various districts in the county. The county executive is elected by the entire county. The current executive is Steve Ehlmann. He was preceded by Joe Ortwerth, who was preceded by Gene Schwendemann, the first county executive of St. Charles County under the new form of government. The executive under the old form of county government was termed a "judge." The county had 258,525 registered voters as of March 2016.

St. Charles County Ambulance District (SCCAD) is the largest such district in Missouri, serving all of St. Charles County and its population of nearly 370,000.

Law enforcement 
The St. Charles County Sheriff's Department (SCCSD) is responsible for court services and security, prisoner transport, civil process, and bailiffs. Until the end of 2014, SCCSD was the primary law enforcement agency serving unincorporated areas of St. Charles County. On January 1, 2015, the St. Charles County Police Department was established and assumed that responsibility. It should not be confused with the St. Charles City Police Department. The St. Charles County Regional SWAT Team is made up of officers from each county law enforcement agency.

The SCCSD Aviation Unit is part of a multi-jurisdictional unit known as the Metro Air Support Unit, with the Metropolitan Police Department, City of St. Louis, St. Louis County Police Department, and St. Charles County Sheriff's Department. In 2007, the fleet included six helicopters, one fixed-wing airplane, six pilots, and eight crew chiefs.

Politics

Local
The Republican Party predominantly controls politics at the local level in St. Charles County. Republicans hold all the elected positions in the county.

State

St. Charles County is divided among twelve legislative districts in the Missouri State House of Representatives, all but one of which are held by Republicans.

District 42 – Jeff Porter (R-Montgomery City, since 2019). Consists of Augusta, Defiance and part of New Melle.
District 63 – Richard West (R-New Melle, since 2021). Consists of Wentzville, Foristell, and part of New Melle.
District 64 – Tony Lovasco (R-O'Fallon, since 2019). Consists of Flint Hill, Josephville, St. Paul, and parts of O'Fallon and St. Peters.
District 65 – vacant (since October 2021). Consists of West Alton, Portage Des Sioux, and part of St. Charles. Most recently represented by Tom Hannegan from 2017 until his death.
District 70 – Paula Brown (D-Hazelwood, since 2019). Consists of parts of St. Charles and Weldon Spring.
District 102 – Ron Hicks (R-St. Charles, since 2019). Consists of Weldon Springs Heights, and parts of O'Fallon, Dardenne Prairie, New Melle, and Weldon Spring.
District 103 – John Wiemann (R-O'Fallon, since 2015). Consists of Cottleville and parts of O'Fallon, St. Peters, and Weldon Spring.
District 104 – Adam Schnelting (R-St. Charles, since 2019). Consists of part of St. Charles and St. Peters.
District 105 – Phil Christofanelli (R-St. Charles, since 2017). Consists of parts of St. Charles and St. Peters.
District 106 – Adam Schwardon (R-St. Charles, since 2021). Consists of parts of St. Charles and St. Peters.
District 107 – Nick Schroer (R-O'Fallon, since 2017). Consists of parts of Lake St. Louis, O'Fallon, and St. Peters.
District 108 – vacant (January 2022). Consists of parts of Lake St. Louis and Dardenne Prairie. Most recently represented by Justin Hill until his resignation.

St. Charles County is divided into two districts in the Missouri State Senate, both of which have elected Republicans.

District 2 – Bob Onder (R-Lake St. Louis, since 2015). Consists of the communities of Augusta, Dardenne Prairie, Flint Hill, Foristell, Josephville, Lake St. Louis, New Melle, O'Fallon, St. Paul, Weldon Spring Heights, and Wentzville.
District 23 – Bill Eigel (R-Weldon Spring, since 2017). Consists of Portage Des Sioux, St. Charles, St. Peters, Weldon Spring, and West Alton.

Federal
Missouri is represented in the U.S. Senate by Roy Blunt and Josh Hawley, whose most recent election results from the county are included here.

Part of St. Charles County is included in Missouri's 2nd Congressional District and is currently represented by Ann Wagner in the U.S. House of Representatives.

Most of St. Charles County is included in Missouri's 3rd Congressional District and is currently represented by Blaine Luetkemeyer (R-St. Elizabeth) in the U.S. House of Representatives.

2016 Missouri presidential primary results
Republican

Donald Trump won the most votes in St. Charles County, with 41.50 percent. U.S. Senator Ted Cruz (R-Texas) came in second with 38.87 percent, Governor John Kasich (R-Ohio) placed third with 10.70 percent, and U.S. Senator Marco Rubio (R-Florida) was fourth with 7.10 percent.

Democratic

U.S. Senator Bernie Sanders (I-Vermont) won the primary with 54.32 percent to former Secretary of State Hillary Clinton's 44.80 percent.

2012 Missouri presidential primary results
Republican

Former U.S. Senator Rick Santorum (R-Pennsylvania) won the most votes in St. Charles County, with 56.29 percent. Former Governor Mitt Romney (R-Massachusetts) came in second with 25.43 percent, and former U.S. Representative Ron Paul (R-Texas) was third with 12.69 percent.

Democratic

With incumbent President Barack Obama facing no serious opposition, few St. Charles County voters voted in the Democratic primary; Obama won 87.83 percent.

2008 Missouri presidential primary results

Republican

Former Governor Mitt Romney (R-Massachusetts) won the most votes in St. Charles County, with 37.72 percent. U.S. Senator John McCain (R-Arizona) came in second with 34.95 percent, former Governor Mike Huckabee (R-Arkansas) placed third with 21.83 percent, and U.S. Representative Ron Paul (R-Texas) was fourth with 3.83 percent.

Democratic

Former U.S. Senator Hillary Clinton (D-New York) received a total of 23,611 votes, more than any candidate from either party in St. Charles County during the 2008 presidential primary.

Communities

Cities

Villages
Josephville
Weldon Spring Heights

Census-designated place
Defiance

Other unincorporated places

Islands

 Apple Island
 Dresser Island
 Ellis Island
 Howell Island
 Two Branch Island

Subregions

Westplex
Westplex is an area within St. Charles County in east-central Missouri to the west of St. Louis County.

The Westplex is part of St. Charles County that used to be called "The Golden Triangle". The "triangle" was formed by I-70 to the north, Missouri Route 94 to the southeast, and I-64 to the southwest. Since almost all of the growth in St. Charles County was within this triangle it was dubbed the "Golden" area of St. Charles county, hence, Golden Triangle. Today the Westplex is made up of St. Charles, St. Peters, Weldon Spring, Cottleville, Dardenne Prairie, O'Fallon, Lake St. Louis, and Wentzville.

See also
List of counties in Missouri
National Register of Historic Places listings in St. Charles County, Missouri

References

External links
St. Charles County Government Website
St. Charles City-County Library District
St. Charles County Ambulance District
Greater St. Charles County Chamber of Commerce
St. Charles County Jail Information
 Digitized 1930 Plat Book of St. Charles County  from University of Missouri Division of Special Collections, Archives, and Rare Books

 
1812 establishments in Missouri Territory
Missouri counties on the Mississippi River
Missouri Rhineland
Populated places established in 1812
Regions of Greater St. Louis